Bibert Kaghado (born 31 March 1974) is an American football manager and a former player.

References

External links
 

1974 births
Living people
American soccer players
American expatriate soccer players
PFC Spartak Nalchik players
Expatriate footballers in Russia
American soccer coaches
American expatriate soccer coaches
Expatriate football managers in Jordan
Expatriate football managers in Russia
Place of birth missing (living people)
Association football midfielders